Rick Zabel (born 7 December 1993) is a road bicycle racer from Germany, who currently rides for UCI WorldTeam . He is the son of Erik Zabel and grandson of Detlef Zabel.

Cycling career
Born in Unna, Zabel won the National Novice Track Championships in 2009, in the Madison event. In 2010 he enjoyed more success in track events, and in 2011, at the UCI Road World Championships in Copenhagen, he was fifth in the men's junior road race.

By summer of 2011 Zabel visited the Pierre de Coubertin sport gymnasium in Erfurt. In 2012 he triumphed in the German road championship in the U23 class. In 2013, Zabel won the under-23 Tour of Flanders, and won a stage at the Tour de Normandie.

On 6 May 2015, Zabel was named in BMC's team for the Giro d'Italia, giving him his first Grand Tour start. On 7 July 2015, his father's 45th birthday, Zabel celebrated his first victory as a professional, winning stage 3 of the Tour of Austria.

In June 2017, he was named in the startlist for the Tour de France.

Major results

2009
 1st  Madison, National Novice Track Championships
2010
 National Junior Track Championships
2nd Madison
3rd Points race
3rd Team pursuit
2011
 4th Overall Driedaagse van Axel
 5th Road race, UCI Junior Road World Championships
2012
 1st  Road race, National Under-23 Road Championships
 2nd Ronde van Limburg
 9th GP Raf Jonckheere
2013
 1st Ronde van Vlaanderen U23
 1st Stage 5 Tour de Normandie
 4th Overall Tour de Gironde
 6th Paris–Tours Espoirs
 7th La Côte Picarde
 7th Münsterland Giro
 8th Overall Olympia's Tour
 10th Arno Wallaard Memorial
2014
 1st Stage 1 (TTT) Giro del Trentino
 6th Eschborn-Frankfurt City Loop
2015
 1st Stage 3 Tour of Austria
2016
 4th Volta Limburg Classic
2017
 2nd Eschborn–Frankfurt – Rund um den Finanzplatz
 9th Paris–Bourges
2018
 10th Overall Dubai Tour
2019
 1st Stage 2 Tour de Yorkshire
 8th Grand Prix of Aargau Canton
2020
 Giro d'Italia
Held  after Stage 1
2022
 Giro d'Italia
Held  after Stage 3

Grand Tour general classification results timeline

References

External links

 
 

1993 births
Living people
German male cyclists
People from Unna
Sportspeople from Arnsberg (region)
Cyclists from North Rhine-Westphalia